L.Y. Cairns School is a Grade 7 to Grade 12 school in Edmonton, Alberta, Canada, specializing towards special needs students with moderate to severe deficits. The school, built starting in 1968 and opened in 1969, is named after Supreme Court of Alberta judge and University of Alberta Chancellor Laurence Yeomans Cairns. In the 2018–2019 school year the school had 429 students enrolled.

Since the year the school opened, it has maintained an annual tradition of the school staffincluding members of the Edmonton Police Service School Resource Officer Unit (since its own founding)serving a Christmas lunch to the students.

References

External links

Middle schools in Edmonton
High schools in Edmonton